Fríða Áslaug Sigurðardóttir (born December 11, 1940 in Hornstrandir-   died May 7, 2010 in Reykjavík) was an Icelandic novelist and short story writer. She made her literary debut in 1980, with the collection of short stories, Þetta er ekkert alvarlegt ("Nothing Serious"). She was awarded the Nordic Council's Literature Prize in 1992 for the novel Meðan nóttin líður ("Through the Night").

Awards 
Icelandic Literary Prize (Íslensku bókmenntaverðlaunin) 1990
Nordic Council's Literature Prize 1992

References

1940 births
2010 deaths
Frida Aslaug Sigurdardottir
Nordic Council Literature Prize winners
Frida Aslaug Sigurdardottir
Frida Aslaug Sigurdardottir
Frida Aslaug Sigurdardottir
Frida Aslaug Sigurdardottir
Frida Aslaug Sigurdardottir
Frida Aslaug Sigurdardottir
20th-century short story writers
21st-century short story writers